Nokia X3-00 (also known as Nokia X3), is a multimedia-oriented mobile phone produced by Nokia. It comes with stereo-wide speakers, built-in FM radio with RDS, a standard 3.5 mm audio jack, media player and 3.2 megapixel camera. The phone runs under the Series 40 software platform. It was announced in September 2009 and later released in December 2009 worldwide.

Available covers include red on black, blue on silver, and pink on silver.

It was mostly considered by reviewers to be a competitor of the Sony Ericsson W395, another music-oriented phone.

Specifications
General
 2G Network: GSM 850 / 900 / 1800 / 1900
 Announced: 2009, September
 Status: available, released December 2009

Size
 Dimensions: 96 x 49.3 x 14.1 mm, 65.8 cc
 Weight: 103 g

Display
 Type: TFT, 256K colors
 Size: 240 x 320 pixels, 2.2 inches

Sound
 Alert types: vibration; downloadable polyphonic, MP3 ringtones
 Loudspeaker: yes, with stereo speakers
 3.5mm jack: yes, dedicated music keys

Memory
 Phonebook: 2000 entries, Photocall
 Call records: 20 dialed, 20 received, 20 missed calls
 Internal: 46 MB
 Card slot: microSD, up to 16 GB, 2 GB included

Data
 GPRS: Class 32
 EDGE: Class 32, 296 / 178.8 kbits
 Bluetooth: Yes, v2.1 with A2DP
 USB: yes, microUSB
 WiFi: no

Camera
 Primary: 3.2 MP, 2048x1536 pixels, enhanced fixed focus
 Video: yes, QCIF@15fps

Features
 Messaging: SMS (threaded view), MMS, email
 Browser: WAP 2.0/xHTML, HTML
 Radio: Stereo FM radio with RDS; built-in antenna
 Games: yes, downloadable
 Colors: red on black, blue on silver
 Java: Yes, MIDP 2.1
- MP4/H.263/H.264/WMV player
- MP3/WAV/eAAC+/WMA player
- Organizer
- Voice memo
- Flash Lite 3.0
- Predictive text input

Battery
 Battery: standard battery, Li-Ion 860 mAh (BL-4CT)
 Stand-by: up to 380 h
 Talk time: up to 7 h 30 min
 Music play: up to 26 h

Accessories
 Nokia X3-00 phone unit
 Charger
 Micro USB cable
 3.5 mm headset
 BL-4CT standard battery
 User's manual
 Nokia brochures and leaflets
 2 GB microSD card

See also
 Nokia 3.1 Plus

References

X3
Mobile phones introduced in 2009
Slider phones
Mobile phones with user-replaceable battery